The 1994 Tel Aviv Open was a men's tennis tournament played on hard courts that was part of the World Series of the 1994 ATP Tour. It was played at the Israel Tennis Centers in the Tel Aviv District city of Ramat HaSharon, Israel from October 10 through October 17, 1994. First-seeded Wayne Ferreira won the singles title.

Finals

Singles

 Wayne Ferreira defeated  Amos Mansdorf 7–6(7–4), 6–3
 It was Ferreira's 5th title of the year and the 11th of his career.

Doubles

 Lan Bale /  John-Laffnie de Jager defeated  Jan Apell /  Jonas Björkman 6–7, 6–2, 7–6
 It was Bale's 2nd title of the year and the 3rd of his career. It was de Jager's only title of the year and the 2nd of his career.

References